, often shortened to  is a public high school, located in Saitama City, Saitama Prefecture, in Japan.  It is one of the few public schools in the prefecture that does not have a school uniform.

Until the 1970s, the school enjoyed prestigious position after Urawa High School and Urawa Ichijo High School.  During the 80s and 90s, it was known as one of the best public schools and sent its alumni to best colleges in Japan including Tokyo University.  Many applicants to the school are attracted by the no school uniform policy and by the liberal atmosphere that encourages students' independence.

Location
The school is located in Urawa-ku, Saitama City and situated in a quiet residential area behind the idyllic scene of Minuma.  The closest train station, JR Yono Station, is within walking distance: 20 minutes (1.7 kilometers).

History
In 1934, Urawanishi High School was founded as a female school called  . In 1950, Educational Reform abolished the prior policy and restarted the school as a coed institution with the current school name, Urawanishi High School. During this period, the institution was located at the western part of Urawa-ku (former Urawa City). In 1956, the school moved to its current site. This resulted in the inconsistency that the school name, which literally means Urawa Western High School, does not signify the school location.

Extracurricular activities
Urawanishi's 22 varsity athletic teams and 23 other clubs offer a wide range of opportunities for extracurricular activities.  In the past, the school was known for its Soccer Team, which won the national title twice in 1956 and 1965.  In recent years, Japanese Archery Team and Basketball Team have won many titles at the prefectural and regional levels.

Notable alumni
 Asa Higuchi, manga artist
 Akira Nishino, soccer player
 Ryozo Suzuki, soccer player
 Sakura Tsukuba, manga artist
 Sumika Yamamoto, manga artist
 Toshiaki Imai, soccer player

References
 http://www.urawanishi-h.spec.ed.jp/ Official school website

Educational institutions established in 1934
High schools in Saitama Prefecture
Schools in Saitama Prefecture
1934 establishments in Japan